The Environmental Modification Convention (ENMOD), formally the Convention on the Prohibition of Military or Any Other Hostile Use of Environmental Modification Techniques is an international treaty prohibiting the military or other hostile use of environmental modification techniques having widespread, long-lasting or severe effects. It opened for signature on 18 May 1977 in Geneva and entered into force on 5 October 1978.

The Convention bans weather warfare, which is the use of weather modification techniques for the purposes of inducing damage or destruction. The Convention on Biological Diversity of 2010 would also ban some forms of weather modification or geoengineering.

Many states do not regard this as a complete ban on the use of herbicides in warfare, such as Agent Orange, but it does require case-by-case consideration.

Parties

The convention was signed by 48 states; 16 of the signatories have not ratified. As of 2022 the convention has 78 state parties.

History
The problem of artificial modification of the environment for military or other hostile purposes was brought to the international agenda in the early 1970s. Following the US decision of July 1972 to renounce the use of climate modification techniques for hostile purposes, the 1973 resolution by the US Senate calling for an international agreement "prohibiting the use of any environmental or geophysical modification activity as a weapon of war", and an in-depth review by the Department of Defense of the military aspects of weather and other environmental modification techniques, US decided to seek agreement with the Soviet Union to explore the possibilities of an international agreement.

In July 1974, US and USSR agreed to hold bilateral discussions on measures to overcome the danger of the use of environmental modification techniques for military purposes and three subsequent rounds of discussions in 1974 and 1975. In August 1975, US and USSR tabled identical draft texts of a convention at the Conference of the Committee on Disarmament (CCD), Conference on Disarmament, where intensive negotiations resulted in a modified text and understandings regarding four articles of this Convention in 1976.

The convention was approved by Resolution 31/72 of the General Assembly of the United Nations on 10 December 1976, by 96 to 8 votes with 30 abstentions.

Environmental Modification Technique
Environmental Modification Technique includes any technique for changing – through the deliberate manipulation of natural processes – the dynamics, composition or structure of the earth, including its biota, lithosphere, hydrosphere and atmosphere, or of outer space.

Structure of ENMOD
The Convention contains ten articles and one Annex on the Consultative Committee of Experts. Integral part of the convention are also the Understandings relating to articles I, II, III and VIII. These Understandings are not incorporated into the convention but are part of the negotiating record and were included in the report transmitted by the Conference of the Committee on Disarmament to the United Nations General Assembly in September 1976 Report of the Conference of the Committee on Disarmament, Volume I, General Assembly Official records: Thirty-first session, Supplement No. 27 (A/31/27), New York, United Nations, 1976, pp. 91–92.

See also
 Arms control agreements
 Environmental agreements
 Climate engineering
 Operation Popeye
 United Nations Convention on Environmental Modification

References

Welcome! | UN GENEVA

External links
 The text of the agreement compiled by the NGO Committee on Education
 Ratifications
 A Political Primer on the ENMOD Convention from the Sunshine Project.

Weather modification
Cold War treaties
International humanitarian law treaties
Environmental treaties
Treaties concluded in 1977
Treaties entered into force in 1978
1978 in the environment
Treaties of the Democratic Republic of Afghanistan
Treaties of Algeria
Treaties of Antigua and Barbuda
Treaties of Argentina
Treaties of Armenia
Treaties of Australia
Treaties of Austria
Treaties of Bangladesh
Treaties of the Byelorussian Soviet Socialist Republic
Treaties of Belgium
Treaties of the People's Republic of Benin
Treaties of the military dictatorship in Brazil
Treaties of Brunei
Treaties of Cameroon
Treaties of Canada
Treaties of Cape Verde
Treaties of Chile
Treaties of the People's Republic of China
Treaties of Costa Rica
Treaties of Cuba
Treaties of Cyprus
Treaties of the Czech Republic
Treaties of Denmark
Treaties of Dominica
Treaties of Egypt
Treaties of Estonia
Treaties of Finland
Treaties of West Germany
Treaties of East Germany
Treaties of Ghana
Treaties of Greece
Treaties of Guatemala
Treaties of Honduras
Treaties of the Hungarian People's Republic
Treaties of India
Treaties of Ireland
Treaties of Japan
Treaties of Kazakhstan
Treaties of Kuwait
Treaties of Kyrgyzstan
Treaties of Laos
Treaties of Lithuania
Treaties of Malawi
Treaties of Mauritius
Treaties of the Mongolian People's Republic
Treaties of the Netherlands
Treaties of New Zealand
Treaties of Nicaragua
Treaties of Niger
Treaties of North Korea
Treaties of Norway
Treaties of Pakistan
Treaties of Panama
Treaties of Papua New Guinea
Treaties of the Polish People's Republic
Treaties of the Socialist Republic of Romania
Treaties of Saint Kitts and Nevis
Treaties of the Soviet Union
Treaties of Saint Lucia
Treaties of Saint Vincent and the Grenadines
Treaties of São Tomé and Príncipe
Treaties of Slovakia
Treaties of Slovenia
Treaties of the Solomon Islands
Treaties of South Korea
Treaties of Spain
Treaties of Sri Lanka
Treaties of Sweden
Treaties of Switzerland
Treaties of Tajikistan
Treaties of Tunisia
Treaties of the Ukrainian Soviet Socialist Republic
Treaties of the United Kingdom
Treaties of the United States
Treaties of Uruguay
Treaties of Uzbekistan
Treaties of Vietnam
Treaties of the Yemen Arab Republic
Treaties of South Yemen
Treaties extended to Akrotiri and Dhekelia
Treaties extended to the Netherlands Antilles
Treaties extended to the Cook Islands
Treaties extended to Niue
Treaties extended to Greenland
Treaties extended to the Faroe Islands
United Nations treaties
Treaties extended to Anguilla
Treaties extended to Bermuda
Treaties extended to the British Virgin Islands
Treaties extended to the Cayman Islands
Treaties extended to the Falkland Islands
Treaties extended to Gibraltar
Treaties extended to Montserrat
Treaties extended to the Pitcairn Islands
Treaties extended to Saint Helena, Ascension and Tristan da Cunha
Treaties extended to South Georgia and the South Sandwich Islands
Treaties extended to the Turks and Caicos Islands
Treaties extended to Brunei (protectorate)
Treaties extended to British Antigua and Barbuda
Treaties extended to Saint Christopher-Nevis-Anguilla
Treaties extended to British Saint Vincent and the Grenadines
Treaties extended to British Saint Lucia
Treaties extended to the British Solomon Islands
Treaties extended to British Hong Kong
Treaties extended to Macau
Treaties extended to British Dominica